The Women's Downhill in the 2023 FIS Alpine Skiing World Cup is currently scheduled to consist of nine events, including the final. The original schedule called for eleven events, but the first two races of the season scheduled for 5 and 6 November 2022 in Zermatt/Cervinia (on the Matterhorn, and crossing an international border between the start (in Switzerland) and the finish (in Italy)) were canceled due to adverse weather conditions; the FIS decided not to reschedule them. Once the season began, a downhill scheduled in St. Anton on 14 January had to be converted into a Super-G due to the inability to hold a pre-race training run on either of the two days prior to the downhill.  However, a subsequent Super-G scheduled at Cortina d'Ampezzo was converted into a downhill, restoring the original schedule.

Three-time discipline champion (and two-time defending champion) Sofia Goggia of Italy won four of the first five downhills, similar to the prior two seasons, and established a lead of more than 200 points. Goggia was the only skier to reach the podium in all five races, as she finished second in the race that she did not win.  After winning the race in Crans Montana, Switzerland, Goggia held a lead of 179 points over 2017 discipline champion Ilka Štuhec of Slovenia, with only two races remaining. In the next downhill in Kvitfjell, Goggia's runner-up finish secured her third straight discipline championship (and fourth overall).

The season was interrupted by the 2023 World Ski Championships in the linked resorts of Courchevel and Méribel, France from 6–19 February 2023. Although the Alpine Skiing branch of the International Ski Federation (FIS) conducts both the World Cup and the World Championships, the World Championships are organized by nation (a maximum of four skiers is generally permitted per nation), and (after 1970) the results count only for World Championship medals, not for World Cup points. Accordingly, the results in the World Championship are highlighted in blue and shown in this table by ordinal position only in each discipline. The women's downhill was held in Méribel on 11 February.

The World Cup finals took place on Wednesday, 15 March in Soldeu, Andorra, which also hosted the finals in 2019. Only the top 25 skiers in the World Cup downhill discipline and the winner of the Junior World Championship, plus any skiers who have scored at least 500 points in the World Cup overall classification for the season, were eligible to compete in the discipline final, and only the top 15 earned World Cup points.

Standings

Legend

DNF = Did Not Finish
DSQ = Disqualified

See also
 2023 Alpine Skiing World Cup – Women's summary rankings
 2023 Alpine Skiing World Cup – Women's Overall
 2023 Alpine Skiing World Cup – Women's Super-G
 2023 Alpine Skiing World Cup – Women's Giant Slalom
 2023 Alpine Skiing World Cup – Women's Slalom
 World Cup scoring system

References

External links
 Alpine Skiing at FIS website

Women's downhill
FIS Alpine Ski World Cup women's downhill discipline titles